Ivan Patrick Tai-Apin (23 February 1977) is a Surinamese actor, director, screenplay writer and producer. He is mostly known for his out of the box theater shows & plays. In 2016 he started a camera acting school in Suriname and is the managing director of It Goes Productions & Casting.

Biography 
Ivan Tai-Apin was born on 23 February 1977 and is the youngest of 4 children. In 1983-1984 he swam with the swimming club Neptunes and became national swimming champion of Suriname in his age category. In 1995- 1996 he became basketball youth champion of Suriname with SCVU. He left Suriname and went to the Netherlands at the age of 21 to study Industrial Engineering at the Hogeschool Rotterdam.

In 2002 during his studies, he started taking acting lessons with Rotterdam Interfaculty Student Cabaret (RISK) under the direction of Han Hazewindus. In 2006 and 2007 he started taking masterclasses in directing at RISK and in 2007 and 2008 he won the student one-act play festival in Rotterdam as a director with the plays 'The vegetarian cobbler' and 'The letter from Don Juan'. In 2008 and 2009 he directed and co-produced the international Unity is Strength Awardshow in Rotterdam for the ‘Eenheid is Kracht’ foundation. In 2009 he coached the festival actors for the UNICEF Children Rights Festival in Rotterdam and was the drama coach for the children who competed for ‘the right to be a star show’. From 2005 to 2008 he worked as a director for the controversial Rotterdam clothing brand Truustrendy and as an actor for Hazewindus Theater Productions.

In 2004 Tai-Apin got his first film role as Stanley in 'A joke goes on a journey and other stories' directed by Dutch director Janwillem de Kok. From 2004 to 2009 he was a member of the board of the Surinamese Inspraak Committee (SIO). In 2010 and 2011 Tai-Apin worked as a director at the Youth Theater School Amsterdam South East (JTSZO) in the Bijlmerparktheater in Amsterdam.In 2011 he directed his last play Lavatorie in the Netherlands and left for his home country Suriname on July 24, 2011.

In 2013 he had a leading role (actor) in the opening show of Carifesta in Suriname, in 2016 he started his production company It Goes Casting & Productions. In 2018 he directed and produced his debut film Wiren, which was selected for the Netherlands Film Festival (NFF) and DBUFF filmfestival in 2019 and became the first Surinamese film on Netflix in 2020. From February 2019 to November 2019 he became interim director of Theater Thalia in Suriname. In november 2020 his debut movie Wiren was the first movie from Suriname that got Submitted by the Suriname Selection Committee for the 93rd Oscars. On January the 28th 2021 The movie Wiren was listed and approved by the Academy of Motion Pictures and Arts.

Filmography

Theater

References 

1977 births
Living people
Surinamese actors
People from Paramaribo